Samuel Thornton was an Anglican bishop in the late quarter of the 19th century and the start of the 20th.

He was born in London on 16 April 1835 and educated at Merchant Taylors' School and Queen's College, Oxford. He was ordained in 1859 and after a spell at the London Diocesan Home Mission became Vicar of St Jude's, Whitechapel. From 1864 to 1875 he was Rector of St George's, Birmingham. In 1875 he was appointed Bishop of Ballarat, a post he held until 1900. On his return to England he became Vicar of Blackburn and an  Assistant Bishop in the Diocese of Manchester. He became a notable proponent of British Israelism. He died on 25 November 1917.

Notes

Anglican bishops of Ballarat
20th-century Anglican bishops in Australia
1835 births
1917 deaths
Anglican clergy from London
People educated at Merchant Taylors' School, Northwood
Alumni of The Queen's College, Oxford